Poshtkuh District is a district (bakhsh) in Neyriz County, Fars Province, Iran. At the 2006 census, its population was 8,875, in 2,334 families.  The District has one city: Meshkan. The District has two rural districts (dehestan): Deh Chah Rural District and Meshkan Rural District.

References 

Neyriz County
Districts of Fars Province